The second I-55 was one of three Type C cruiser submarines of the C3 sub-class built for the Imperial Japanese Navy. Commissioned in April 1944, she was lost in July 1944 while taking part in the Marianas campaign during World War II.

Design and description
The Type C3 submarines were derived from the earlier C2 sub-class although with fewer torpedo tubes, an additional deck gun, and less-powerful engines to extend their range. They displaced  surfaced and  submerged.

For surface running, the boats were powered by two  diesel engines, each driving one propeller shaft. When submerged each propeller was driven by a  electric motor. They could reach  on the surface and  underwater.

The boats were armed with six internal bow  torpedo tubes and carried a total of 19 torpedoes. They were also armed with two /40 deck guns and one twin mount for  Type 96 anti-aircraft guns.

Construction and commissioning

Ordered under the Additional Naval Armaments Supplement Programme and built at Kure Navy Yard at Kure, Japan, I-55 was laid down on 15 June 1942 with the name Submarine No. 628. On 1 November 1942, she was provisionally attached to the Kure Naval District and numbered I-55; she was the second Japanese submarine of that number, the first  having been renumbered I-155 on 20 May 1942. Launched on 20 April 1943, she was completed and commissioned one year later, on 20 April 1944.

Service history
Upon commissioning, I-55 was based in the Kure Naval District and assigned to Submarine Squadron 11 in the 6th Fleet. In late June 1944, she was selected for conversion to carry Special Naval Weapon No. 8, a version of the Fu-Go balloon bomb that could be launched at sea, the conversion involving the installation of hydrogen and balloon-launching equipment. Meanwhile, however, the Combined Fleet had activated Operation A-Go for the defense of the Mariana Islands on 13 June 1944, and the Marianas campaign had begun with the U.S. invasion of Saipan on 15 June. Before her conversion could begin, I-55 got underway from Kure on 30 June 1944, called at Yokosuka from 1 to 6 July 1944, and then departed for Guam towing an Unpoto gun container, a  sled that could carry up to 15 tons of cargo, usually in the form of three Type 96  howitzers and ammunition for them.

While she was at sea on 10 July 1944, I-55 was reassigned to Submarine Division 15 in the Advance Force, and on 13 July she received orders to abort her supply mission to Guam and proceed to Tinian to rescue the staff of the 1st Air Fleet there. She cast the Unpoto container adrift and headed for Tinian. At 00:40 Japan Standard Time on 13 July, she transmitted a message to 6th Fleet Headquarters estimating that she would arrive off Tinian on 15 July. The Japanese never heard from her again.

The submarine′s position was reported to a United States Navy hunter-killer group, which detached the high-speed transport  and destroyer escort  to hunt it down. The two ships arrived at the submarine′s last reported position at 00:22 on 14 July 1944 and began their search. She began her attack at 07:26 by dropping a pattern of 13 depth charges, followed by a second pattern of 13 depth charges at 07:52. At 0804, her crew observed pieces of wood rising to the surface about  ahead on William C. Miller′s starboard bow, then heard a heavy underwater explosion at 08:05 that shook the ship, followed by bubbles rising to the surface that made the water appear to boil. William C. Miller dropped a third pattern of 13 depth charges at 0806, sinking the submarine.

It remains a matter of dispute as to whether William C. Miller sank I-55 or the submarine . The destroyer escorts  and  also have received credit for sinking I-55 in an antisubmarine action on 28 July 1944.

On 15 July 1944, the Imperial Japanese Navy declared I-55 to be presumed lost with all 112 hands off Tinian. She was stricken from the Navy list on 10 October 1944.

Notes

References

External links
 Tabular movements of submarine I-55
 warsailors.com 

Type C3 submarines
Ships built by Kure Naval Arsenal
1943 ships
World War II submarines of Japan
World War II shipwrecks in the Philippine Sea
Japanese submarines lost during World War II
Maritime incidents in July 1944
Ships lost with all hands
Missing submarines of World War II